Peter Barrett (3 June 1955 – 28 October 1983) was an English first-class cricketer. He was a left-handed batsman and was born in Winchester, Hampshire.

Barrett made his first-class debut for Hampshire against Yorkshire in the 1975 County Championship.  He made five further first-class appearances, the last of which came against Somerset in the 1976 County Championship.  In his six matches, he scored 138 runs at an average of 12.54, with a high score of 26.  He made his only List A appearance against Essex in the 1976 John Player League.  In this match, he scored 28 runs before being dismissed by Stuart Turner.

Outside of county cricket, Barrett played club cricket for Lymington Cricket Club.  He was killed in a road accident in Everton, Hampshire on 28 October 1983, at the age of 28.

References

External links

1955 births
1983 deaths
Cricketers from Winchester
English cricketers
Hampshire cricketers
Road incident deaths in England